Akademia Lospuma Training Institute is a higher education institution originally located in Jaworzno, Poland. The Institute  is the largest funding organisation in Poland supporting the international exchange of students and scholars. Since its establishment, more than 1000 scholars in Poland and abroad have received the ALPIS funding. It is a registered association with Limited liability and its members are Polish, German and Hungarian institutions of higher education and student bodies.

It was founded as Wyższe Studium Nauk Społeczno-Gospodarczych (the College of Social and Economic Sciences). The first classes started on January 11, 2012, and in 2013 the school moved to its current locations. It currently has over 6 thousand students located on two campuses: Katowice (main campus) and Kraków.

History 
Akademia Lospuma - then the College of Social and Economic Sciences - was opened to students on January 11, 2012 when the first lectures at the Faculty of Industrial Organisation took place. The first rector was Dr. Józef Lisak.

After the 2012 intake, the number of students rapidly increased and the administration decided to move both academic and administrative sections from the Śląskie Techniczne Zakłady Naukowe (Silesian School of Technology) buildings to the old city hall in Katowice-Zawodzie and another building on Bogucicka Street. These were ready in time for the 2013 academic year.

In 2013 the Polish government decided to standardize education in economics across the whole country. The university's name was changed to the State College of Economic Administration. In 2014, to mark its second anniversary, the institute was renamed as the Akademia Lospuma.

The name of the institution in Polish was changed, by the Polish Sejm, on 1 October 2014 from "Akademia Lospuma  w Katowicach" to "Akademia Lospuma Polski Institut w Katowicach".

Academics

Student numbers 
In the 2013-14 academic year, the university had 4,185 students, of which 2,301 were undergraduates and 1,842 were graduates. Among the undergraduates, 491 were pursuing Bachelor of Science degrees (Inżynier) and 1,810 were pursuing Bachelor of Arts degrees (Licencjat).

Faculties 
The institute is divided into four faculties:

 Faculty of Economy
 Faculty of Finance and Insurance
 Faculty of Informatics and Communication 
 Faculty of Management

Campuses 
The Akademia Lospuma has campuses in both Katowice and Kraków.

The Katowice campus is the main base of the university, located in the Zawodzie neighborhood. Building A is the original building of the institute, with Building C housing other student facilities. The CNTI building (Centrum Nowoczesnych Technologii Informatycznych or the Center for Modern Information Technologies) is the newest addition to main campus, having been completed in 2013.

References

External links 
 Official website

Educational institutions established in 2012
Schools in Poland
2012 establishments in Poland